This is a list of notable clowns.

Circus-style
 Albert Alter - American clown
 António Branco – Batatinha (literally Little Potato), from Portugal
 Arthur Vercoe Pedlar – "Vercoe", an English clown
 Barry Lubin – "Grandma", star clown of the Big Apple Circus 
 Bim Bom – clown duo of early 20th Century Russia
 Carequinha – Brazilian clown and actor, born in a circus to a circus family Brazil
 Cepillín – Mexican clown
 Cha-U-Kao - French clown, performer at the Moulin Rouge
 Charlie Bell – American clown, Ringling Bros. circus
 Charlie Cairoli – Italian-born British clown
 Pinto Colvig - American clown who later became famous as the voice of Goofy. 
 Daniel Rice (1823–1901) – American clown of the 19th century and principal inspiration for Uncle Sam.
 David Shiner – Tony Award-winning American born mime and circus clown who has appeared on Broadway and with several European circuses
 Demetrius Nock – "Bello Nock," star clown in Ringling Brothers Barnum and Bailey Circus
 Dimitri – Swiss clown and mime
 Emmett Kelly – American tramp clown
 Frankie Saluto – American clown, Ringling Bros. circus
 The Fratellini Family – family of French clowns
 George Carl – American clown who performed mainly in Europe.
 Glen "Frosty" Little – America's last living Master Clown and longtime "Boss Clown" with the Ringling Brothers and Barnum and Bailey Circus
 Greg and Karen DeSanto – husband and wife clown/comedy team
 Grock – Charles Adrien Wettach (1880–1959), Swiss clown
 Joe Jackson Sr. and Jr. – tramp clown entree with a breakaway bicycle
 Johann Ludwig Jacob Lou Jacobs (1903–1992) – American Master Clown. Credited with inventing the clown car gag.
 Josep Andreu i Lasserre – Charlie Rivel European clown
 Jose de Jesus Medrano – Chuchin (1953–1984), Mexican clown and performance star
 José Vega Santana – Remi (1958–) – "Puerto Rico's Greatest Clown"
 Michael Halvarson – Swedish clown and star pickpocket entertainer who has appeared in Cirque du Soleil Kooza
 Mikhail Nikolayevich Rumyantsev – Karandash (1901–1983), Soviet Clown and clowning teacher.
 Nicolai Poliakoff – Coco the Clown longtime star clown of the Bertram Mills Circus
 Oleg Popov (1930–2016), Russian clown, student of Karandash
 Otto Griebling – (1896–1972), American Master Clown with the Cole Bros. and Ringling circuses
 Paul Hunt – gymnast clown
 Pierre Étaix (1928–2016), French clown, comedian and filmmaker
 Pogo the Clown - American serial killer John Wayne Gacy, who volunteered as a clown at hospitals
 Roly Bain (1954 – 2016) English priest and clown who preached and performed as Holy Roly. He helped set up the organisation Holy Fools.
 Sergey Pavlov – "Lalala", Russian clown, director and actor
 Skeeter Reece – American clown
 Steve Smith – "T.J. Tatters", longtime director of Ringling Clown College
 Tiririca - Brazilian clown who started his career in the circus, later becoming a singer, gaining fame on TV and becoming a politician
 Vicki Gabereau – Rosie Sunshine, ran as a candidate in the 1974 Toronto mayoral election
 Yuri Nikulin – Russian clown and actor
 Jack Perry and Doug McKenzie – Zig and Zag Australian television clowns

Rodeo
 Flint Rasmussen – seven-time winner of Man in the Can award.
 Johnny Tatum – American rodeo clown
 Quail Dobbs – American rodeo clown
 Slim Pickens – American rodeo clown and film actor.

Film
 Abbott and Costello (William (Bud) Abbott, 1897–1974; Louis Costello, 1906–1959) – American comedy duo specializing in the white clown (straight man)/red clown (comic) relationship 
 Ben Turpin (September 19, 1869 – July 1, 1940) – cross-eyed comedian, best remembered for his work in silent films
 Buster Keaton (October 4, 1895 – February 1, 1966) – "The Great Stoneface"
 Charlie Chaplin (April 16, 1889 – December 25, 1977) – British born comedian. His principal character was "The Little Tramp"
 Chester Conklin (January 11, 1886 – October 11, 1971) – American comedian and actor
 Harry Langdon (June 15, 1884 – December 22, 1944) – American silent film comedian and mime
 Jacques Tati (October 9, 1908 – November 5, 1982) – French comedian, mime and filmmaker; played the socially inept Monsieur Hulot
 Keystone Cops – incompetent group of policemen created by Mack Sennett for his Keystone Film Company between 1912 and 1917
 Laurel and Hardy – comedy duo in film
 Martin and Lewis – American comedy duo, comprising singer Dean Martin (as the "straight man") and comedian Jerry Lewis (as his stooge)
 The Marx Brothers – team of sibling comedians that appeared in vaudeville, stage plays, film and television
 Peter Sellers (September 8, 1925 – July 24, 1980) – English comedian and actor; played Inspector Clouseu
 Roscoe "Fatty" Arbuckle (March 24, 1887 – June 29, 1933) – actor, was involved in the "Fatty Arbuckle scandal"
 Shaggy 2 Dope – DJ of the Insane Clown Posse, Detroit-based hip-hop group with a fan army of "schizophrenic wizards" called the juggalos and star of underground film Big Money Hustlaz
 Slim Pickens – rodeo clown and film actor
 Snub Pollard (November 9, 1889 – January 19, 1962) – silent film comedian, popular in the 1920s
 The Three Stooges – slapstick comedians
 W.C. Fields (January 29, 1880 – December 25, 1946) – American comedian and actor
 Violent J – leader of the Insane Clown Posse, a Detroit-based hip-hop group and star of Big Money Hustlaz underground film.
 Jim Varney - Actor of Ernest P. Worrell

Television
 Lucille Ball – I Love Lucy, The Lucy-Desi Comedy Hour, The Lucy Show, Here's Lucy
 Bassie – clown on the Dutch "Bassie & Adriaan" television series, played by Bas van Toor
 Benny Hill – The Benny Hill Show
 Milton Berle – Texaco Star Theater, Berle's Buick Hour
 Blinky the Clown – played by Russell Scott as the star of "Blinky's Fun Club" in Colorado, Denver.
 Bozo the Clown – franchised character played by many local television performers and on cartoons, based on the character created in 1946 by Alan W. Livingston for Capitol Records' record-reader series
 Bubbles the Clown – clown doll that appears on BBC test cards F, J & W.
 Charlie Chalk – main character of the British children's TV series of the same name.
 Clarabell the Clown – regular character from the Howdy Doody television program, originally played by Bob Keeshan of Captain Kangaroo fame.
 Der Clown - German TV clown
 Doink the Clown – gimmick used by several wrestlers in the 1990s. Doink began as a heel wrestler in the evil clown archetype, but later Doinks portrayed the character as a babyface who loved to entertain the children in the crowd.
 Dink the Clown – midget sidekick of Doink the Clown.
 Flunky the Clown – Character of comedy writer Jeff Martin on Late Night With David Letterman .
 Herman the Clown - main character of Finnish series Pelle Hermanni.
 Homey the Clown – character from the In Living Color television program, whose famous catchphrase was "Homey don't play that (or dat)".
 John Michael Howson – 'clown' from Adventure Island.
 Nasse Setä – Character of Finnish comedian Vesa-Matti Loiri
 Loonette the Clown - main character of Canadian series The Big Comfy Couch.
 Mr. Noodle – character created by Bill Irwin for the "Elmo's World" segment of Sesame Street
 Mr Tumble – character on Something Special, played by Justin Fletcher
 Patati Patatá – Brazilian TV
 J.P. Patches – Seattle children's television mainstay for decades.
 Paul Reubens – Pee-wee Herman, Pee-Wee's Playhouse.
 Peppi & Kokki - Two Dutch clowns who starred in their own children's TV series. 
 Pinky Lee – The Pinky Lee Show
 Pipo de Clown – main character of the Dutch children's TV series of the same name.
 Piñón Fijo – Argentine TV
 Red Skelton – The Red Skelton Show
 Roberto Gómez Bolaños - Better known as Chespirito, he created and played El Chavo and El Chapulín Colorado
 Rowan Atkinson – Mr. Bean
 Jim Allen – Rusty Nails (1957–1972), Pacific Northwest children's television clown, and model (in part) for Matt Groening's "Krusty" character on the television program The Simpsons
 Sid Caesar – Your Show of Shows and Caesar's Hour
 Soupy Sales – The Soupy Sales Show
 Yucko the Clown – The Howard Stern Show, known for rude observations, obscenities and public intoxication
 Os Trapalhões - Didi, Dedé, Mussum and Zacarias, from the TV show of the same same.
 Zig and Zag (Australian performers)

Theatrical
 A. Robins – vaudeville's "The Banana Man" and "One Man Music Shop"
 Alan Clay – international clown teacher and performer; author of Angels Can Fly, a Modern Clown User Guide
 Alex the Jester – "King of Jesters," speaks a contemporary version of the medieval gibberish language Grammelot.
 Andy Kaufman – American comic and practitioner of anti-humor
 Avner Eisenberg – also known as Avner the Eccentric, a "Broadway" clown
 Bill Irwin – Tony Award-winning clown known for his new vaudeville-style performances
 Blue Man Group – trio of silent characters that perform covered in blue paint
 Clark and McCullough – Bobby Clark and Paul McCullough started as circus clowns and progressed to be stars of stage and screen
 Sylvester the Jester – The Human Cartoon
 Dario Fo – Capo Comicio, creator of "Mistero Buffo" and "Accidental Death of an Anarchist"; recipient of the 1997 Nobel Prize in Literature; uses Arlecchino stage persona, political activist
 Ed Wynn – The Perfect Fool
 Eric Davis – Cirque du Soleil clown and creator of Red Bastard
 Geoff Hoyle – stage clown, started in the Pickle Family Circus with Bill Irwin and Larry Pisoni
 George Carl – longtime star of the Crazy Horse Saloon in Paris
 George Washington Lafayette Fox, American stage clown during the 19th century
 James and Jamesy, Canadian clown duo
 Jango Edwards – American clown and entertainer in the European cabaret tradition
 John Gilkey – Cirque du Soleil clown
 Joseph Grimaldi – credited with being "the first whiteface clown" — in an homage to Grimaldi, circus clowns began referring to themselves and each other as "Joey"s, and the term 'joey' is now a synonym for clown
 Marceline Orbes (1874–1927) – performed in Europe and for many years at the New York Hippodrome.
 Morro and Jasp – Canadian clown duo
 Mump and Smoot – Canadian "clowns of horror"
 Olsen and Johnson – stars of Broadway's Hellzapoppin'''
 Puddles Pity Party (Michael Geier) – American traditional popular singer and YouTube celebrity who performs as a whiteface clown. Billed as the "sad clown with the golden voice."
 Richard Pochinko – founder of "Canadian Clowning" style
 Richard Tarlton – actor and clown in the Elizabethan theatre in England
 Richard Usher – 19th-century clown, performed at Astley's Amphitheatre
 Robert Armin – actor and clown in Shakespeare's company
 Sergey Pavlov – Russian clown "LALALA", creator of "LALALA SHOW"
 Slava Polunin – Russian-born clown and creator of "Slava's Snowshow"
 Spike Jones and his City Slickers – American musical act featuring slapstick circus-style comedy
 Thomas Monckton – award-winning physical clown 
 Tommy Cooper – British comedy magician
 W. C. Fields – vaudeville comedy star
 Will Kempe (fl. c 1589–1600) – actor dancer and clown who worked with Shakespeare; famously jigged his way from Norwich to London in 1600
 Wolfe Bowart – stage clown touring internationally with his productions LaLaLuna and The ShneedlesFictional
 Adam the Clown – from the video game Dead Rising. Equipped with two chainsaws that he juggles, he is a boss in the game.
 Binky the Clown – from the Garfield comic by Jim Davis.
 Buggy the Clown – an antagonist of the manga and anime One Piece Buttons the Clown – a central character from the 1952 film The Greatest Show on Earth, played by James Stewart
 Calvero – clown character played Charlie Chaplin in the film Limelight Captain Spaulding – from the horror films House of 1000 Corpses and The Devil's Rejects 
 Chuckles the Clown – Mary Tyler Moore Show background character who was trampled to death in an episode
 Colly Wobble, a clown toy in CBeebies TV show Moon and Me Crackers the Clown, played by Peter Brocco – "bad-guy" clown in the Adventures of Superman episode titled "The Clown Who Cried".
 Dodo Delwyn – once a famous Ziegfeld star, is reduced to playing clowns in burlesque and amusement parks in 1953 film The Clown; played by Red Skelton
 Dr. Rockso – the Rock & Roll Clown from Metalocalypse
 Fatso the Clown – clown statue in The 70s Show episode titled "Fun It"
 Fizbo the Clown - Cam Tucker's clown character from Modern Family.
 Frenchy the Clown – character of the national lampoon comic Evil clown comics series.
 The Ghost Clown – evil hypnotist clown featured in the Scooby-Doo, Where Are You! episode titled "Bedlam in the Big Top"
 Gamzee Makara – clown-like Highblood Troll and one of the antagonists of the webcomic "Homestuck"
 I Pagliacci, (The Clowns) – tragic opera by Ruggiero Leoncavallo prominently features Arlecchino as a character
 Jack – advertising icon for the fast food company, Jack in the Box
 Jack Point – from the Judge Dredd Megazine's The Simping Detective series
 Jojo – main character on the Disney Channel's Jojo's Circus The Joker – supervillain often called the "Clown Prince of Crime" created by DC Comics
 Kefka Palazzo – main antagonist of Final Fantasy VI
 Killer Klowns – from the horror films Killer Klowns from Outer Space Koko the Clown – from Max Fleischer's Out of the Inkwell series of animated cartoons. 
 Krusty the Clown – television clown on the Fox animated television series The Simpsons Mr. Magic Pierrot - a monster of the day in the fourth season of the Sailor Moon anime series. Some clown-like monsters called "Pierrot" also appear in the Sailor Moon musicals and in the live-action series.
 Murder the Clown - from the Goosebumps Most Wanted book "A Nightmare on Clown Street", also appeared in the 2015 Goosebumps film.
 Pennywise the Dancing Clown (also known as "It") – shape-shifting monster in Stephen King's It and its adaptations
 Pierrot Bolneze – from Yakitate! Japan, clown, bread judge and master of ceremonies, he's also the crown prince of Monaco according to the series
 Rajoo – circus clown and the central character in Raj Kapoor's film Mera Naam Joker Rollo the Clown – played by William (Billy) Wayne, the "good-guy" clown in the Adventures of Superman episode titled "The Clown Who Cried".
 Rollo the Clown – from the 1991 film The Little Engine That Could, based on the children's book of the same name.
 Ronald McDonald – McDonald's fast-food restaurant chain's advertising clown character, first portrayed by Willard Scott.
 Sacarrolha - protagonist in a long-running Brazilian comic strip, created by Primaggio Mantovi. 
 Shakes the Clown – title character of the film of the same name.
 Splinters – title character in a newspaper comic strip by William Steinigans, which ran between 1911 and 1912. 
 Stan – clown name of the character Louison in the 1991 French film Delicatessen.
 Sweet Tooth – sociopathic serial killer who is a primary protagonist/antagonist in theTwisted Metal franchise.
  Tricky the clown from the Newgrounds series Madness Combat
 Violator – serial killer and one of the enemies from the Spawn franchise.
 Vulgar the Clown – protagonist of the 2000 motion picture Vulgar Wobble – roly-poly clown from the BBC children's TV show Playbus (later Playdays)
 Yorick – court jester who featured as the subject of a lengthy soliloquy in Shakespeare's Hamlet''

See also
 Evil clown
 List of jesters

References

Clowns